Makundi's brush-furred rat (Lophuromys makundii) is a species of rodent in the family Muridae. It is found in Tanzania.

References

Lophuromys
Mammals described in 2007